Foothill Observatory  is an astronomical observatory owned and operated by Peninsula Astronomical Society (PAS) and Foothill College.  It is located on the college's campus in Los Altos Hills, California (US). The observatory is used by students enrolled in the introductory astronomy lab on campus, which is part of the college's thriving astronomy for non-scientists program, serving over 800 students per year. A  Schmidt-Cassegrain telescope was donated to the observatory and went into operation in 2007.

Conditions permitting, the PAS opens the observatory for public viewing every clear Friday night from 9 p.m. to about 11 p.m., and for solar viewing every clear Saturday morning from 10 a.m. to 12 p.m. As of 2022 the schedule is reduced due to the COVID-19 pandemic and associated precautions. Always check the PAS website for schedule specifics.

See also 
List of observatories
Andrew Fraknoi, former Chair of the Astronomy Department at Foothill College (retired 2017)

References

External links
Peninsula Astronomical Society
Foothill College Observatory (Foothill College)
Foothill College Astronomy Department
Foothill Observatory Clear Sky Clock Forecasts of observing conditions.
Meade LX 200 Telescope

Astronomical observatories in California
Buildings and structures in Santa Clara County, California
Tourist attractions in Santa Clara County, California